Nabih al-Azma (Arabic: نبيه العظمة‎; 1886 – 1964) was a Syrian politician and the defense minister of Syria in 1946.

Background 
Nabih was born in Damascus in 1886 to a notable family in Damascus and he is the nephew of Yusuf al-'Azma. He studied at the Ottoman Military Academy and graduated in 1917 from Istanbul.

Career 
He was elected to the Syrian parliament, and served as defense minister in 1946.

References 

Syrian ministers of defense

Al-Azma family

1886 births
1964 deaths